This is a list of all teams and players who have won the Tipperary Senior Hurling Championship since its inception in 1887.

By team

References